The Left is a democratic socialist political party in Luxembourg. On the political spectrum it is often considered a left-wing or radical left political party. The Left is associated with The Left in the European Parliament – GUE/NGL group in the European Parliament but does not have any members. The party participates in the Party of the European Left. 

The Left was founded by the New Left and the Communist Party of Luxembourg (KPL) as an electoral party. It had members from both parties and independents. In the 1999 Luxembourg general election, the Left won 3.3% of the votes and one seat in the parliament; André Hoffmann was elected from the southern constituency. In 2000, after anticipated elections in the city of Esch sur Alzette, Hoffmann became deputy mayor and Aloyse Bisdorff (KPL) succeeded him in parliament. In accordance with the Left's statutes, Bisdorff resigned from parliament and was succeeded by Serge Urbany in 2002. A dispute arose between a number of members of the KPL and the majority of the Left, and the two parties ran separate lists in the 2004 Luxembourg general election. The Left won 1.9% of the votes and lost its parliamentary presence. In the 2009 Luxembourg general election, it increased its share of the vote to 3.3% and Hoffmann returned to parliament as the Left's sole representative; Hoffmann's personal vote of 9,067 in the south constituency was almost equal to the total number of votes gathered by the KPL, which won 10,803 votes. In 2013, the party elected two members (Serge Urbany and Justin Turpel).

Election results

Parliament

European Parliament

References

Bibliography 
 Wehenkel, Henri, Communisme et postcommunisme au Luxembourg, in: Communisme 2014, 1989-2014 - L'éternel retour des communistes, p. 165-172
 Wehenkel, Henri/Redondo, Jean-Laurent/Hoffmann, André/Urbany, Serge, Table ronde: PCL et/ou nouvelle gauche: renouvellement et/ou scission, in: Cahiers Marxistes, No. 201, April–May 1996, p. 121-144

External links 
 
 Official newspaper
 
 

1999 establishments in Luxembourg
Democratic socialist parties in Europe
Party of the European Left member parties
Political parties established in 1999
Political parties in Luxembourg
Socialist parties in Luxembourg